The Curious Conduct of Judge Legarde (released in 1920 as The Valley of Night) is a 1915 American drama silent black and white film directed by Will S. Davis. It is based on the play of the same name by Victor Mapes and Louis Forest. The film is lost.

This film, The Case of Becky (1915) and The Brand of Satan (1917) established a basic framework of representation which is still often utilized (the split personality).

Cast
 Lionel Barrymore as Judge Randolph Legarde
 Edna Pendleton as Amelia Garside
 William H. Tooker as Inspector Barton
 Roy Applegate as Big Charles
 T.W.M. Draper
 August Balfour
 Charles E. Graham
 Arthur Morrison
 Ed Roseman
 Thomas O'Keefe
 Betty Young

References

Bibliography

External links
 
 

American films based on plays
Films based on works by American writers
Silent American drama films
1915 drama films
1915 films
American silent feature films
American black-and-white films
Films directed by Will S. Davis
1910s American films